Actinochaetopteryx  is a genus of tachinid flies in the family Tachinidae. Its members occur in the Palaearctic, Oriental, and Australasian realms. The type species is Actinochaetopteryx actifera, from Taiwan.

Species

Actinochaetopteryx actifera Townsend, 1927
Actinochaetopteryx antennalis Dear & Crosskey, 1982
Actinochaetopteryx argentifera Shima, 1988
Actinochaetopteryx aurifasciata Dear & Crosskey, 1982
Actinochaetopteryx bivittata Dear & Crosskey, 1982
Actinochaetopteryx japonica Mesnil, 1970
Actinochaetopteryx nubifera Malloch, 1935
Actinochaetopteryx nudibasis Malloch, 1935
Actinochaetopteryx nudinerva Mesnil, 1953
Actinochaetopteryx patellipalpis Richter, 1986Richter, 1986
Actinochaetopteryx proclinata Shima, 1988
Actinochaetopteryx setifacies Shima, 1988

References

Diptera of Asia
Diptera of Australasia
Dexiinae
Tachinidae genera
Taxa named by Charles Henry Tyler Townsend